Bir pletok is a non-alcoholic Indonesian drink of the Betawi people in Jakarta, Indonesia. Pletok beer is made from several spices, namely ginger, pandan leaves, boiled sappan wood, and lemongrass.

Bir pletok is mostly found in Indonesia and is considered a genuine Betawinese drink.

Most lagers are alcoholic and are known to have negative health effects but, despite being referred to as a "beer", Pletok does not contain alcohol.

The drink is inspired by the Dutch colonists that brought new traditions to Batavia; one being drinking alcoholic drinks late at night. The nearby individuals of Betawi made their own particular home-made, alcohol-free brew, since a large portion of Betawi individuals were Muslim, for whom alcohol consumption is forbidden.

The standard method of serving it is by shaking it until a froth like that of a traditional beer appears. is shaped before it's filled a serving glass. A bamboo tube was the first bundling of bir pletok. As the fluid put away in the tube and some ice shapes blended with the fluid, the bamboo is shaken for 1-2 minutes, delivering the dull hints of "pletak-pletok."

Betawi people used to drink this refreshment in the night to warm their bodies. Its tanned, bright red shading and pink froth is very eye-catching. Its taste is sweet, warm, and somewhat zesty.

See also

 List of Indonesian beverages
 List of Indonesian drinks

References

Non-alcoholic drinks
Beer in Indonesia
Indonesian drinks